The 1939 NCAA basketball tournament involved eight schools playing in single-elimination play to determine the NCAA Men's Division I Basketball Championship.  It was the first NCAA basketball national championship tournament, although it was operated by the National Association of Basketball Coaches (NABC) at the time.

The tournament began on March 17 and ended with the championship game on March 27 on Northwestern University's campus in Evanston, Illinois. A total of eight games were played, including a single third-place game in the West region. The East region did not hold a third-place game until 1941, and there was no national third-place game until 1946.

Oregon, coached by Howard Hobson, won the national title with a 46–33 victory in the final game over Ohio State, coached by Harold Olsen.  Jimmy Hull of Ohio State was named the tournament's Most Outstanding Player. 

Despite its success in this first tournament, Oregon would not make another Final Four until 2017.

Schedule and venues
The following are the sites selected to host each round of the 1939 tournament:

Regionals

March 17 and 18
East Regional, The Palestra, Philadelphia, Pennsylvania
March 20 and 21
West Regional, California Coliseum, Golden Gate International Exposition, San Francisco, California

Championship Game

March 27
Patten Gymnasium, Evanston, Illinois

Teams

Bracket

Regional third place

See also
 1939 National Invitation Tournament
 1939 NAIA Division I men's basketball tournament

References

NCAA Division I men's basketball tournament
Tournament
NCAA basketball tournament
NCAA basketball tournament
NCAA basketball tournament
NCAA basketball tournament